Cornutella is a genus of radiolarians in the family Theoperidae. C. clathrata, the type species, was described from the Miocene of Caltanisetta, Sicily.

References

External links 
 

 Cornutella at geologie.mnhn.fr

Polycystines
Radiolarian genera